is a national park in the Chūbu region of the main island of Honshū, Japan formed around several active and dormant volcanoes. It spans the  mountainous areas of Gunma, Nagano, and Niigata prefectures. The name refers to the two mountain ranges that make up the park. It was divided into two separate areas: the Southern Niigata/North Nagano Area and the East Nagano Area.

History
Jōshin'etsu-kōgen National Park was established in 1949 and significantly expanded in 1956 to include the Myōkō-Togakushi mountainous region. The latter was separated as Myōkō-Togakushi Renzan National Park on March 27, 2015 with 39.772 ha.

Etymology

The name of the park consists of two elements. The second, "kōgen", means tableland or plateau.

Southwest Mikuni Mountain Range Area

 includes Mount Tanigawa and two active volcanoes -- Mount Kusatsu-Shirane and Mount Asama. Mount Asama is the most active volcano on Honshū.

Recreation

The Jōshin'etsu Kōgen National Park is a popular tourist destination for skiing, mountain climbing, hiking, and onsen hot spring resorts. The Eastern Area holds the popular skiing areas of Sugadaira and Shiga Kōgen. The Shiga-Kusatsu-Kogen Ridge Highway traverses this section of the park, connecting the Yamanouchi Hot Springs, including the onsens of Yudanaka, in the north with the resort town of Karuizawa, Nagano Prefecture in the south.

Karuizawa can be reached from Tokyo via the JR East Nagano Shinkansen.

See also 
 List of national parks of Japan

External links 

 Ministry of Environment description

References

National parks of Japan
Parks and gardens in Gunma Prefecture
Parks and gardens in Nagano Prefecture
Parks and gardens in Niigata Prefecture
Protected areas established in 1949